"My Ship Is Comin' In" is a song written by Joey Brooks which was first a song for the American soul singer Jimmy Radcliffe in 1965 and was later recorded and released by the American pop group The Walker Brothers as their fourth single that same year. Outside the US and Canada, the song's title was "My Ship Is Coming In". The accompaniment was directed by Ivor Raymonde. The song appeared as the opening track on the group's debut US studio album Introducing the Walker Brothers.

"My Ship Is Coming In" was a major hit in Britain, spending twelve weeks on the UK Singles Chart and peaking at #3 in January 1966 and their second of three hits in the US peaking at #63 on the Billboard Hot 100. "You're All Around Me" was included as the b-side and is the second song to have a writing credit from Scott Walker (as Scott Engel), the song written with singer-songwriter Lesley Duncan was also featured on the group's début album Take It Easy with The Walker Brothers.

Track listing

Chart positions

References

1965 singles
The Walker Brothers songs
1965 songs
Philips Records singles
Smash Records singles
Song recordings produced by Ivor Raymonde
Songs written by Joseph Brooks (songwriter)